

People
Luke (given name), a masculine given name (including a list of people and characters with the name)
Luke (surname) (including a list of people and characters with the name)
Luke Skywalker, the main character of the Star Wars original trilogy
Luke the Evangelist, author of the Gospel of Luke. Also known as Saint Luke.
Uncle Luke (born 1960), American rapper. Also known as Luke.
Luke (The Walking Dead), a fictional character from The Walking Dead

Biblical books
Gospel of Luke, a Christian Gospel
Luke–Acts, the composite work of the Gospel of Luke and the Acts of the Apostles in the New Testament

Music
Luke (album), by Steve Lukather
Luke (French band)
 "LUKE", a song by Susumu Hirasawa from Glory Wars
Luke Records, a record label

Organizations 
Accademia di San Luca, (the "Academy of Saint Luke"), founded in 1577 as an association of artists in Rome 
Guild of Saint Luke, a medieval artists' guild named after Saint Luke

Places
 Luke (Čajniče), a village in the municipality of Čajniče, Bosnia and Herzegovina
 Luke (Hadžići), a village in Sarajevo Canton, Bosnia and Herzegovina
 Luke (Pale), a village in the municipality of Pale, Bosnia and Herzegovina
 Luke, Vareš, a village in the municipality of Vareš, Bosnia and Herzegovina
 Luke (Ivanjica), a village in the municipality of Ivanjica, Serbia
 Luke, Estonia, village in Nõo Parish, Tartu County, Estonia
Luke Manor
 Luke, North Macedonia, a village in Kriva Palanka
 Luke, Maryland, a town in the United States
 Luke, an oldentime English overname of the Dutch placename Luik, now known as Liege, Belgium; also, an English word for goods such as velvet and iron from Luik
 Luke Air Force Base, Glendale, Arizona, United States
Luke Field, Ford Island, Hawaii, United States, name of the Army Air Force airfield from 1919 to c. 1939
Luke railway station, Luke, Manitoba, Canada

Other uses
 Luke, a 1970s British boutique run by Gordon Luke Clarke
Baron Luke, a title in the Peerage of the United Kingdom

See also

Louka (disambiguation)
Luka (disambiguation)
Saint Luke (disambiguation)